The title Hero of Tajikistan (Tajik: Қаҳрамони Тоҷикистон) is a state award of Tajikistan. It was first awarded in 1996 and was awarded for service to the implementation of domestic and foreign policy.

Status and symbols 
Individuals who are awarded the title of Hero of Tajikistan are awarded a special distinctive "Golden Star", which is worn on a tape on the left side of the chest. People who are awarded the title receive a monthly 100% premium to their assigned pension. Recipients are also given:

 A living space provided by the state
 Free vouchers for federal workers at the workplace 
 A free travel pass once a year 

With the consent of the heirs of deceased recipients, his awards and documents on the award can be transferred to state museums for storage and display. If the deceased recipient has no heirs, his/her awards and award documents are returned to the state.

List of recipients 

 Sadriddin Ayni – 8 September 1996
 Bobojon Ghafurov – 1997
 Emomali Rahmon – 1999
 Mirzo Tursunzoda – 2001
 Nusratullo Maksum – 27 June 2006
 Shirinsho Shotemur – 27 June 2006

References 

Tajikistani awards
Awards established in 1996
1996 establishments in Tajikistan
Orders, decorations, and medals of Tajikistan
Hero (title)